A. Pearce Tomkins (April 15, 1875 – September 29, 1937) was an American lawyer, farmer and politician.

Born in Ashland, Wisconsin, Tomkins went to the Ashland Public Schools. He then went to University of Wisconsin and Columbian Law School in Washington, D. C. He was admitted to the Wisconsin Bar in 1897. He lived in the town of Eileen, Bayfield County, Wisconsin. He practiced law and was a dairy farmer. Tomkins served as chairman of the Eileen Town Board and on the Bayfield County Board of Supervisors. He also served as assessor for the city of Ashland. From 1913 to 1917, Tomkins served in the Wisconsin State Senate and was a Republican. From 1918 until with death in 1937, Tomkins served as assessor of incomes for the Wisconsin Tax Commission. Tomkins died suddenly at his home in Ashland, Wisconsin.

Notes

External links

1875 births
1937 deaths
People from Ashland, Wisconsin
People from Bayfield County, Wisconsin
George Washington University Law School alumni
University of Wisconsin–Madison alumni
Farmers from Wisconsin
Wisconsin lawyers
County supervisors in Wisconsin
Mayors of places in Wisconsin
Republican Party Wisconsin state senators